The Miami Hurricanes football statistical leaders are individual statistical leaders of the Miami Hurricanes football program in various categories, including passing, rushing, receiving, total offense, defensive stats, and kicking. Within those areas, the lists identify single-game, single-season, and career leaders. The Hurricanes represent the University of Miami in the NCAA's Atlantic Coast Conference.

Miami began competing in intercollegiate football in 1926, but these lists are dominated by more recent players for several reasons:
 Since 1926, seasons have increased from 10 games to 11 and then 12 games in length.
 The NCAA didn't allow freshmen to play varsity football until 1972 (with the exception of the World War II years), allowing players to have four-year careers.
 Bowl games only began counting toward single-season and career statistics in 2002. The Hurricanes have played in 12 bowl games since this decision, giving many recent players an extra game to accumulate statistics.
 Due to COVID-19, the NCAA ruled that the 2020 season would not count against the athletic eligibility of any football player, giving all players who appeared in that season five years of eligibility instead of the normal four.

These lists are updated through the end of the 2016 season.

Passing

Passing yards

Passing touchdowns

Rushing

Rushing yards

Rushing touchdowns

Receiving

Receptions

Receiving yards

Receiving touchdowns

Total offense
Total offense is the sum of passing and rushing statistics. It does not include receiving or returns.

Total offense yards

Touchdowns responsible for
"Touchdowns responsible for" is the NCAA's official term for combined passing and rushing touchdowns.

Defense

Interceptions

Tackles

Sacks

Kicking

Field goals made

References

Miami

Miami-related lists